Men's Downhill World Cup 1989/1990

Calendar

Note:

Round 3 was the first ever held downhill sprint in two heats.

Final point standings

In Men's Downhill World Cup 1989/90 all results count.

Men's Downhill Team Results

bold indicate highest score - italics indicate race wins

References
 fis-ski.com

External links
 

World Cup
FIS Alpine Ski World Cup men's downhill discipline titles